Adrian Breen (born 28 May 1992) is an Irish hurler who plays for Limerick Senior Championship club Na Piarsaigh and at inter-county level with the Limerick senior hurling team. He usually lines out as a right wing-forward.

Career statistics

Honours

Ardscoil Rís
 Dr Harty Cup (1): 2010

University College Cork
Fitzgibbon Cup (1): 2013
All-Ireland Freshers' Hurling Championship (1): 2011

Na Piarsaigh
 All-Ireland Senior Club Hurling Championship (1): 2016
 Munster Senior Club Hurling Championship (4): 2011, 2013, 2015, 2017
 Limerick Senior Hurling Championship (6): 2011, 2013, 2015, 2017, 2018, 2020

Limerick
All-Ireland Senior Hurling Championship (1): 2020
Munster Senior Hurling Championship (1): 2020
National Hurling League (1): 2020
Munster Senior Hurling League (1): 2020
Munster Under-21 Hurling Championship (1): 2011

References

1992 births
Living people
Limerick inter-county hurlers
Na Piarsaigh (Limerick) hurlers